Tootsie Duvall (sometimes credited as Susan Duvall or Susan "Tootsie" Duvall) is an American film, theatre and television actress.

Early life
She was born Susan Steinweidle.

Career
In recent years, she is known for her role as Assistant Principal Marcia Donnelly in the television series The Wire.

Selected filmography

Second Thoughts (1983)
Tin Men (1987)
Major League II (1994)
Serial Mom (1994)
Pecker (1998)
Species II (1998)
Liberty Heights (1999)
A Dirty Shame (2004)
Syriana (2005)
Rocket Science (2007)

Selected television work

The Initiation of Sarah (1978) (television film)
Starsky and Hutch (1978; 1 episode)
Zuma Beach (1978) (television film)
Starting Fresh (1979) (television series pilot)
Angie  (1979–1980; 3 episodes)
The Greatest American Hero (1982; 1 episode)
Thou Shalt Not Kill (1982) (television film)
The Corner (2000; 3 episodes) (television miniseries)
The Wire (2006–2008; 12 episodes)

References

External links

American film actresses
American stage actresses
American television actresses
Living people
Actresses from Baltimore
Year of birth missing (living people)
Place of birth missing (living people)
21st-century American women